Squalius svallize is a species of freshwater fish in the family Cyprinidae.
It is found in Bosnia and Herzegovina and Croatia.
Its natural habitats are rivers and inland karsts.
It is threatened by habitat loss.

References

Squalius
Fish described in 1858
Taxonomy articles created by Polbot
Endemic fauna of the Balkans
Freshwater fish of Europe
Endemic fish of the Neretva basin
Species endangered by river-damming
Fish of Bosnia and Herzegovina